This list ranks the world's cable-stayed bridges by the length of main span, i.e. the distance between the suspension towers. The length of the main span is the most common way to rank cable-stayed bridges. If one bridge has a longer span than another, it does not mean that the bridge is the longer from shore to shore, or from anchorage to anchorage. However, the size of the main span does often correlate with the height of the towers, and the engineering complexity involved in designing and constructing the bridge.

Cable-stayed bridges with more than three spans are generally more complex, and bridges of this type generally represent a more notable engineering achievement, even where their spans are shorter.

Cable-stayed bridges have the second-longest spans, after suspension bridges, of bridge types. The Russky Bridge over the Eastern Bosphorus in Vladivostok, Russia, with its  span, has the longest span of any cable-stayed bridge, displacing the former record holder, the Sutong Bridge over the Yangtze River in the People's Republic of China  on 12 April 2012.

Completed cable-stayed bridges
This list of largest cable-stayed bridges includes all bridges with a main span of at least  in length. This list only includes bridges that carry vehicular traffic, such as automobiles or trains. It does not include suspension bridges, footbridges or pipeline bridges.

Cable-stayed bridges under construction

Planned and proposed bridges

Longest cable-stayed bridge decks
The definition of cable-stayed bridge deck length used here is: A continuous part of the bridge deck that is supported only by stay-cables and pylons, or are free spans. This means that columns supporting the side span as for example found in Pont de Normandie, excludes most of the side span decks from the cable-stayed deck length.

There are some bridges with long bridge decks whose span lengths have not been published, and therefore are missing. Extradosed bridges are not included. The thirty longest decks are:

Timeline of world record lengths
Many early suspension bridges included cable-stayed construction, including the 1817 footbridge Dryburgh Abbey Bridge, James Dredge's patented Victoria Bridge, Bath (1836), and the later Albert Bridge, London (1872), and Brooklyn Bridge (1883).  Their designers found that the combination of technologies created a stiffer bridge.  Albert Caquot's 1952 concrete-decked cable-stayed bridge over the Donzère-Mondragon canal at Pierrelatte is one of the first of the modern type, but had little influence on later development.  The steel-decked Strömsund Bridge designed by Franz Dischinger (1956) is therefore more often cited as the first modern cable-stayed bridge.

This list tracks the bridge having the longest cable-stayed main span through time.

This list may be incomplete and detailed sources for pre-modern cable-stayed bridges may not be available, so the timeline might not be accurate.

See also

List of longest suspension bridge spans
List of cable-stayed bridges in the United States
List of spans — list of remarkable permanent wire spans
Floating cable-stayed bridge
Cable-stayed suspension bridge

References
Nicolas Janberg, Structurae.com, International Database for Civil and Structural Engineering

Others references

Further reading
 — includes a list of major cable-stayed bridges by length

External links

Lists of bridges
Lists by length
Bridges, cable-stayed
Bridge, Cable-stayed
Bridges, cable-stayed